Gary Bell may refer to:
 Gary Bell (baseball) (born 1936), American Major League Baseball pitcher
 Gary Bell (footballer) (born 1947), English footballer
 Gary Bell Jr. (born 1992), American basketball player